The Big Whopper mine is a large mine located at Separation Lake,  in Ontario, Canada. Big Whopper represents one of the largest tantalum reserves in Canada having estimated reserves of 13.8 million tonnes of ore grading 0.007% tantalum and 1.34% lithium.

References 

Tantalum mines in Canada